Kirill Ilinski is a Russian born British businessman and scientist. He is the founder and Chief Investment Officer of Fusion Asset Management and the author of "Physics of Finance: Gauge Modelling in Non-Equilibrium Pricing" (Wiley & Sons, 2001) Managing Partner and Chief Investment Officer of Fusion Asset Management.

Education 
Kirill Ilinski graduated from the Saint Petersburg State University with the MSc in Physics in 1992 and received a PhD in Mathematical Physics from the Mathematical Institute of Russian Academy of Sciences in 1994.

Career
After moving to the United Kingdom Kirill continued his academic career at the University of Birmingham as a Physics Research Fellow. Ilinski has now published more than 40 papers focusing on the use of theoretical physics in the financial modelling. In 2001 Ilinski published his book “Physics of Finance: Gauge Modelling in Non-Equilibrium Pricing” which summarises his research of the gauge theory application to the asset pricing.

In 2000 Ilinski started his financial career joining Chase Manhattan Bank where he focused on proprietary modelling, options trading and risk management. In 2003 Ilinski developed the Credit Risk Reversal model for JP Morgan Debt-Equity Relative Value Group aiming to provide better hedging for the bank's global bonds book. In 2004 Kirill left JP Morgan to set up Fusion Asset Management, and investment management firm focusing on managing volatility risks that now has around £1 billion of assets under management.

Kirill is credited as the creator of The Shock Absorber Fee (SAFe), a special compensation structure aimed to reduce the systemic risks involved in hedge funds.

References

Links
Physics of Finance - review by Cosma Rohilla Shalizi, Statistics Department, Carnegie Mellon University

Living people
British chief executives
British corporate directors
1957 births
Chief investment officers